This is a possibly incomplete list of French ambassadors to Guatemala.

List

Quellen 
 ambafrance-gt.org
 diplomatie.gouv.fr

Guatemala
France